A board mix is a recording created by running lines directly off a mixing console while the sound is mixed in real-time.  The alternative to a board mix is use a virtual mixing console, an increasingly popular approach.

References

Sound recording
Audio mixing